A SWAT-Bot is an automated mobile personnel shield used by Paramilitary forces such as SWAT teams for ballistic protection for methods of entry. They are manufactured by Howe & Howe Technologies.

Development
The SWAT-Bot was first developed in 2012 as the RS1-RBS1 robotic ballistic shield.

See also
 History of the tank
 Ballistic shield
 Riot shield
 Mantlet

References

External links
SWAT-Bot video

Shields
Protective gear